Olga Valeryevna Medvedtseva, former Pyleva, née Zamorozova, (born 7 July 1975) is a former Russian biathlete.

At the 2002 Winter Olympics, she won an individual gold medal in the 10 km pursuit, as well as the bronze medal in the team relay. She won her second gold at the 2010 Winter Olympics in a relay.

Pyleva also won twice at the Holmenkollen ski festival biathlon competition during the 2004–05 season in the sprint and pursuit events.

She retired after the 2009–10 season.

Doping offense and disqualification in 2006 
At the 2006 Winter Olympics she won the silver in the women's 15 km individual race, but on February 16, 2006, she was disqualified from further competition for failing a drug test  when she tested positive for the stimulant carphedon. The International Olympic Committee panel found her guilty, and she was expelled from the games and stripped of her medal. She was then banned for two years from competition, and the authorities in Turin started a criminal investigation into the matter.  The head of the Russian Anti-Doping Committee claimed that Pyleva took an over-the-counter medication for an ankle injury prescribed by her personal doctor who is not a team doctor, which contained carphedon.

Record

Olympic Games

World Championships

See also
 Russia at the 2006 Winter Olympics
 List of sportspeople sanctioned for doping offences

References

External links
 

1975 births
Biathletes at the 2002 Winter Olympics
Biathletes at the 2006 Winter Olympics
Biathletes at the 2010 Winter Olympics
Doping cases in biathlon
Holmenkollen Ski Festival winners
Living people
Russian female biathletes
Olympic biathletes of Russia
Olympic gold medalists for Russia
Olympic bronze medalists for Russia
Sportspeople from Krasnoyarsk
Olympic medalists in biathlon
Soviet sportspeople in doping cases
Russian sportspeople in doping cases
Competitors stripped of Winter Olympics medals
Biathlon World Championships medalists
Medalists at the 2010 Winter Olympics
Medalists at the 2002 Winter Olympics